Undo is a software debugging company based in Cambridge, UK. The company was founded in 2005 by Greg Law and Julian Smith. Undo’s technology is used by software engineering teams to debug software programs.

History
Undo was initially bootstrapped in 2005 by Greg Law and Julian Smith out of Law’s garden shed in Cambridge. Law and Smith developed the core technology that would eventually become UDB (formerly UndoDB), a reversible debugger for Linux software.

LiveRecorder was then developed based on UndoDB to enable development teams to record and replay the execution of software programs.

In 2012, Undo secured its initial seed funding. It closed a $3.3 million Series A funding round in 2016, and a $14 million Series B in 2018.

References

Companies based in Cambridge
Software companies of the United Kingdom
Software companies established in 2005